Camilla Johansson (born 3 November 1976 in Växjö) is a retired Swedish track and field athlete who specialised in the triple jump. She represented her country at the 2000 Summer Olympics failing to qualify for the final.

Early in her career she also competed in the long jump.

Competition record

Personal bests
Outdoor
Long jump – 6.75 (0.0 m/s) (Växjö 1999)
Triple jump – 14.15 (+0.5 m/s) (Halmstad 2003)

Indoor
60 metres – 7.69 (Malmö 2003)
Long jump – 6.49 (Malmö 1999)
Triple jump – 14.12 (Ghent 2000) NR

References

1976 births
Living people
Swedish female long jumpers
Swedish female triple jumpers
Athletes (track and field) at the 2000 Summer Olympics
Olympic athletes of Sweden
People from Växjö
Sportspeople from Kronoberg County
21st-century Swedish women